Vincent Blasi, born January 28, 1943, is an American legal scholar. He is the Corliss Lamont Professor of Civil Liberties at Columbia Law School.

Biography 
Blasi graduated from Northwestern University in 1964, received his J.D. from the University of Chicago Law School in 1967, and commenced his law teaching career the following year. He joined the faculty of Columbia Law School in 1983. 

His scholarship has focused on the history and philosophy of the freedom of speech. He is best known for his "checking value" and "pathological perspective" theories of the free speech and free press clauses of the First Amendment, and for his detailed studies of the free speech theories of John Milton, Learned Hand, Oliver Wendell Holmes, and Louis Brandeis." 

He was the James Madison Professor of Law at the University of Virginia School of Law from 2004 to 2009 while continuing to serve on the Columbia faculty. He also has taught at the University of Texas School of Law (1967-69) and the University of Michigan Law School (1970-82), and was a visiting professor at Stanford Law School (1969-70), UC Berkeley School of Law (1978-79), and William & Mary Law School (1991).   

From 1986 to 2008 he co-taught a course in the Columbia Journalism School on freedom of the press with the New York Times reporter and columnist Anthony Lewis.  Blasi regularly team-teaches his law school courses and seminars with the renowned First Amendment litigators Floyd Abrams, Jameel Jaffer, and Donald Verrilli.

He was elected a fellow of the American Academy of Arts and Sciences in 1998. He was a 1993–1994 fellow of the National Humanities Center.

Blasi delivered the 1995 Elliot Lecture at the Yale Law School, the 1999 Nimmer Lecture at the UCLA School of Law, and the 2000 Irvine Lecture at Cornell Law School.

References 

Living people
Northwestern University alumni
University of Chicago Law School alumni
Columbia Law School faculty
University of Virginia School of Law faculty
University of Texas School of Law faculty
University of Michigan Law School faculty
Stanford Law School faculty
UC Berkeley School of Law faculty
College of William & Mary faculty
Fellows of the American Academy of Arts and Sciences
Year of birth missing (living people)